Nad or Nadd is a small village in the south-east of the barony of Duhallow, in north County Cork, Ireland. It is located on the Kanturk to Cork route (R579) in the foot hills of the Boggeragh Mountains, at the confluence of the Nadd and Glen Rivers. The population of the village and surrounding areas is approximately 170 people. The population has been increasing over a number of years with many young families now living in the area. Nad is located within the Cork North-West (Dáil constituency).

See also
 List of towns and villages in Ireland

References

Towns and villages in County Cork